Walter Palk (1742-1819), of Marley House (later renamed Syon Abbey) in the parish of Rattery, Devon, England, was a Member of Parliament for his family's Pocket Borough of Ashburton in Devon from 1796 to 1811. He served as Sheriff of Devon (1791-2) and in 1798 was a Captain in the  Ashburton Volunteer Militia, one of many such units formed across Devon to counter a possible invasion by Napoleon.

Origins
He was the eldest son of Walter Palk (d.1801) of Headborough and Yolland Hill, in the parish of Ashburton, a small farmer and clothier, by his first wife Thomasine Withecombe of Priestaford, Ashburton. His uncle was the wealthy Sir Robert Palk, 1st Baronet (1717-1798) of Haldon House in the parish of Kenn, in Devon, an officer of the British East India Company who served as Governor of the Madras Presidency, later an MP for Ashburton in 1767 and between 1774 and 1787 and for Wareham, between 1768 and 1774.

Landholdings
Shortly before 1810 he purchased the manor of Rattery together with several local estates, and built Marley House, a large Georgian country house, as his new seat within the parish of Rattery.

Marriage and children
On 15 February 1782 he married Elizabeth Lyde, by whom he had two daughters, only one of whom survived:
Elizabeth Palk, only daughter and sole heiress, who in 1806 married Sir Henry Carew, 7th Baronet (1779–1830) of Haccombe in Devon.

References

|-

1742 births
1819 deaths
Members of the Parliament of Great Britain for Ashburton
British MPs 1796–1800
Members of the Parliament of the United Kingdom for Ashburton
UK MPs 1801–1802
UK MPs 1802–1806
UK MPs 1806–1807
UK MPs 1807–1812
High Sheriffs of Devon